Corey Nathan Peters  (born 12 July 1983) is a New Zealand alpine skier and Paralympic medalist. He has represented New Zealand at three Paralympics.

Career
He won a gold medal at the 2022 Winter Paralympic Games in the sitting downhill event. Peters described his gold medal-winning run as  "probably the run of my life." Less than 24 hours later Peters won a silver medal in the super G sitting event. Peters said that picking up the two medals was more than he expected. "Definitely, I think I have exceeded my own expectations," he said.

He had previously won a silver medal at the 2014 Winter Paralympic Games, and a bronze  medal at the 2018 Winter Paralympic Games.

Awards 
Peters was named Sportsperson of the Year at the Taranaki Sports Awards in 2015. He was also named Snow Sports NZ Overall Athlete of the Year and Adaptive Snow Sports Athlete of the Year in 2015 and 2014. Peters also won the overall Sportsperson award at the Taranaki Sports Awards in 2022.

Corey was named Para Athlete of the Year at the 60th ISPS Handa Halberg Awards for his Beijing 2022 performances.

In the 2023 New Year Honours, Peters was appointed a Member of the New Zealand Order of Merit, for services to sit-skiing.

References

External links
  (archive)
 

1983 births
Living people
New Zealand male alpine skiers
Alpine skiers at the 2014 Winter Paralympics
Alpine skiers at the 2018 Winter Paralympics
Medalists at the 2014 Winter Paralympics
Medalists at the 2018 Winter Paralympics
Paralympic silver medalists for New Zealand
Paralympic bronze medalists for New Zealand
Paralympic alpine skiers of New Zealand
Paralympic medalists in alpine skiing
Paralympic gold medalists for New Zealand
Medalists at the 2022 Winter Paralympics
Alpine skiers at the 2022 Winter Paralympics
Members of the New Zealand Order of Merit